Budafoki Munkás Testedző Egyesület is a Hungarian football club from the town of Budafok, Budapest, Hungary. The club currently plays in the Nemzeti Bajnokság II.

History 
The club was founded in 1912 as Világosság Football Club. At that time, Budafok was not part of Budapest; it joined the capital city only in 1950, along with other towns such as Újpest and Kispest.

Budafok mostly played in the second division of Hungarian football hierarchy, the Nemzeti Bajnokság II between World War I and World War II. However, the club got promoted and debuted in the 1945–46 season of the Hungarian League, and finished ninth. The manager of the club in the top division was the legendary Gusztáv Sebes.

After the fall of Communism, there was a high risk that the club would be dissolved just like many other clubs in Hungary. At that time, Hungarovin, the wine-producing company financed the club. However, the company was sold to Henkell during the privatisation in Hungary. The new owner, Henkell wanted to expand its Budafok factory and wanted to use the club's football stadium too for this purpose. The club was very close to dissolution at this point. However, two sports leaders, Sándor Vízi and Rezső Gallow started to negotiate, aiming to take the football club out of the privatisation and thus to find a way to save football in Budafok. In the end, they succeeded and the football stadium was excluded from the privatisation of the company and a new era started in the life of the club.

In 2015, János Jakab a former Budafok player became the president of the club. Jakab, who also managed MEDOSZ Erdért (the former club of Prime Minister of Hungary, Viktor Orbán) and who was also president of the Puskás Akadémia FC had excellent contacts in the Hungarian football. Jakab was searching for new investors for the football club. He met Róbert Bélteky, a Hungarian-Australian entrepreneur, whom he managed to convince that it is a great opportunity to invest in the club, which then opened a new chapter in the life of Budafok. Bélteky was not new to football, he was the owner of the most popular Australian association football club, Melbourne Victory FC. When Bélteky was asked about the purchase in an interview with Nemzeti Sport, he explained: "I wanted to purchase a club and then see it prospering", "I did not want to buy a club from the first league and my friend Jakab suggested Budafok". Eventually, Bélteky purchased the 95% of the club, while the remaining 5% shares now belong to the Foundation for Budafoki Football.

Budafok merged with Újbuda FC, which allowed the club to advance from the Budapest league to the Nemzeti Bajnokság III. The club started the competitions in the 2015-16 Nemzeti Bajnokság III season. The club finished fourth in that season. After the strong start, Budafok stepped up an other level, and won the 2016-17 Nemzeti Bajnokság III season with manager László Prukner, while the club managed to reach the semi-finals of the 2016-17 Magyar Kupa, where they were beaten by Ferencvárosi TC.

In 2017, the club signed former Inter Milan and A.C. Milan striker Attila Filkor.

On 13 May 2017, Budafok won the 2016–17 Nemzeti Bajnokság III season thereby gaining promotion to the 2017–18 Nemzeti Bajnokság II season.

On 29 June 2017 it was announced by the club that their former player, Lóránt Oláh, became the sport director.

In the 8th round of the 2018–19 Magyar Kupa season, Budafok were eliminated by MOL Vidi FC.

In 2020, the club was promoted to the Nemzeti Bajnokság. Due to the COVID-19 pandemic, the 2019-20 Nemzeti Bajnokság II was interrupted and finally terminated in May. The club was the second at that time, therefore they were promoted to the 2020-21 Nemzeti Bajnokság I.

Bélteky, the owner of the club and resident of Australia, might miss the first match of the 2020-21 Nemzeti Bajnokság I season due to the COVID-19 pandemic.

Current squad

Out on loan

Name Changes 
1912–1913: Világosság Football Csapat
1913–1919: Budafoki Atlétikai és Football Club
1919–1922: Budafoki Munkás Testedző Egyesület
1922–1950: Budafoki Műkedvelő Testedző Egyesület
1950: merger with Budapesti Gyárépítők
1950–1951: Budapesti Gyárépítők MTE
1951–1956: Budapesti Gyárépítők SK
1956–1957: Budafoki Építők Munkás Testedző Egyesüle
1957–?: Budafoki MTE Kinizsi Sportegyesület
1988–1992: Budafoki MTE-Törley
1993–2006: Budafoki LC
2006–2007: Budafoki Lombard Labdarúgó "Club"
2007–2017: Budafoki Labdarúgó Club
2017–    : Budafoki MTE

Seasons
As of 28 June 2020

Notes
 Note 1:
R64: Round of 64

Other Notes
Italics: in progress
R: Runners-up
SF: Semi-finals
QF: Quarter-finals
GS: Group stage
PO: Play-offs

Managers

References

External links 
  

 
1912 establishments in Hungary
Association football clubs established in 1912
Football clubs in Budapest